LaSalle—Émard—Verdun is a  federal electoral district in Montreal, Quebec. It was created by the 2012 federal electoral boundaries redistribution and was legally defined in the 2013 representation order. It came into effect upon the call of the 42nd Canadian federal election, scheduled for 19 October 2015. It was created out of parts of Jeanne-Le Ber (51%) and LaSalle—Émard (49%) plus a small section of territory between the Lachine Canal and the Le Sud-Ouest borough boundary taken from Westmount—Ville-Marie and an adjacent uninhabited section from Notre-Dame-de-Grâce—Lachine.

The riding was originally intended to be named LaSalle—Verdun.

The former Member of Parliament for the LaSalle—Émard riding, Hélène Leblanc, sought reelection in the new riding for the NDP.

Geography
The riding includes the borough of Verdun (excluding Nuns' Island), part of the borough of LaSalle, along with the neighbourhoods of Ville-Émard and Côte-Saint-Paul in the Le Sud-Ouest borough.

Demographics
According to the Canada 2016 Census

 Languages (2016 mother tongue) : 58.8% French, 18.9% English, 3.3% Spanish, 3.1% Mandarin, 2.7% Italian, 1.8% Arabic, 1.4% Russian, 0.8% Cantonese, 0.8% Bengali, 0.7% Romanian, 0.6% Polish, 0.6% Portuguese, 0.5% Vietnamese, 0.4% Bulgarian, 0.4% Greek, 0.4% Albanian

Members of Parliament
This riding has elected the following Members of Parliament:

Election results

References

Federal electoral districts of Montreal
LaSalle, Quebec
Verdun, Quebec
2013 establishments in Quebec
Le Sud-Ouest